Éric Wolfer (born 27 February 1966) is a French volleyball player. He competed in the men's tournament at the 1992 Summer Olympics.

References

1966 births
Living people
French men's volleyball players
Olympic volleyball players of France
Volleyball players at the 1992 Summer Olympics
Sportspeople from Brussels